James Johnston was an Irish politician. He was an independent member of Seanad Éireann from 1938 to 1948. He was first elected to the 2nd Seanad in April 1938 by the Labour Panel. He was-elected at the August 1938, 1943 and 1944 elections. He lost his seat at the 1948 Seanad election.

References

Year of birth missing
Year of death missing
Irish farmers
Members of the 2nd Seanad
Members of the 3rd Seanad
Members of the 4th Seanad
Members of the 5th Seanad
Independent members of Seanad Éireann